Bov Point (‘Nos Bov’ \'nos 'bov\) is the ice-covered point on the south side of the entrance to Kayak Bay on the east coast of Brabant Island in the Palmer Archipelago, Antarctica.

The point is named after the settlement of Bov in Western Bulgaria.

Location
British mapping in 1980 and 2008.

Maps
 Antarctic Digital Database (ADD). Scale 1:250000 topographic map of Antarctica. Scientific Committee on Antarctic Research (SCAR). Since 1993, regularly upgraded and updated.
British Antarctic Territory. Scale 1:200000 topographic map. DOS 610 Series, Sheet W 64 62. Directorate of Overseas Surveys, Tolworth, UK, 1980.
Brabant Island to Argentine Islands. Scale 1:250000 topographic map. British Antarctic Survey, 2008.

References
 Bulgarian Antarctic Gazetteer. Antarctic Place-names Commission. (details in Bulgarian, basic data in English)
 Bov Point. SCAR Composite Antarctic Gazetteer.

External links
 Bov Point. Copernix satellite image

Headlands of the Palmer Archipelago
Bulgaria and the Antarctic